The Society for Research on Nicotine and Tobacco (SRNT) is an international nonprofit organization and professional association that studies and shares research on nicotine and tobacco use from a public health and scientific perspective. It is the largest organization focused on nicotine and tobacco, with members in 40 countries. SRNT has its own official scientific journal, Nicotine & Tobacco Research, founded in 1999 and published by Oxford University Press. SRNT’s work has been used by the World Health Organization and governments in setting policies on topics such as tobacco advertising, taxation, smoke-free laws, and smoking cessation. SRNT has been particularly active in work on the WHO Framework Convention on Tobacco Control and the Tobacco Master Settlement Agreement in the US. SRNT does not accept funding from the tobacco industry. The organization does accept funding from pharmaceutical companies that make medications to help people quit smoking.

SRNT was founded in 1994. Work from SRNT members was noted in public discussion leading up to the Family Smoking Prevention and Tobacco Control Act in the US and SRNT is cited as an expert source in the Act. SRNT also hosts SRNT University, a "collection of organized, curated training, scientific articles, and tools and resources for people working in Nicotine & Tobacco Research and related professions." The society and its members have also been involved in the current debate on tobacco harm reduction, the safety and prevalence of e-cigarettes, and other public health issues.

References

External links
 
 Nicotine & Tobacco Research - a journal by SRNT

1999 establishments in Wisconsin
International learned societies
International medical and health organizations
International medical associations
International professional associations
Medical and health organizations based in Wisconsin
Organizations based in Madison, Wisconsin
Organizations established in 1999
Pharmacological societies
Public health organizations
Smoking
Tobacco control
Tobacco researchers